Cooking Vinyl is a British independent record label, based in Acton, London, England, founded in 1986 by former manager and booking agent Martin Goldschmidt and business partner Pete Lawrence. Goldschmidt remains the current owner and chairman, while Rob Collins is managing director. The company focuses on artist service-based deals where the artist retains ownership of their copyrights.

History

1986–1992
Cooking Vinyl was set up in 1986 by former manager and booking agent Martin Goldschmidt and distribution manager Pete Lawrence, who initially ran the business as a part-time venture out of a spare room in Goldschmidt's council house in Stockwell, South London.

In 1986 Cooking Vinyl recorded an impromptu live performance around a campfire at a folk festival by the singer Michelle Shocked, on a Sony Walkman with fading batteries. One of its first releases, Cooking Vinyl released the recording as The Campfire Tapes, and it sold 250,000 copies worldwide.

In 1989, the company was close to bankruptcy when their distributors, Rough Trade, went into receivership. Pete Lawrence sold his stake in the business to Martin Goldschmidt who continued the business while servicing the debt of the company of a period of five years.

1993–1999
Besides traditional royalty agreements, Cooking Vinyl developed ‘artist services’ deals in the 1990s, where the artist retains ownership of the copyright of their recorded material. The first of these contracts was done in 1993 for the reissue of Billy Bragg's Back To Basics compilation. 

Since then, Bragg has re-engaged with Cooking Vinyl a total of six times, most recently in 2013 for the release of studio album Tooth And Nail.

Cooking Vinyl has provided similar services for Alison Moyet, Black Spiders, Gary Numan, James Skelly & The Intenders, Madness, Pigeon Detectives, Reverend and The Makers, Ron Sexsmith, and The View.

2000–2010
In 2009, Cooking Vinyl partnered on the release of The Prodigy's fifth studio album Invaders Must Die, which went on to sell 1.2 million units worldwide and was the biggest-selling independent record of the year in Europe.

In 2012, Amanda Palmer, an advocate of the DIY approach, announced that she was partnering with Cooking Vinyl in a distribution and label services deal for the European release of her studio album Theatre Is Evil. The album was funded through a high-profile Kickstarter campaign that raised over $1.2 million in 30 days.

Also released in 2012 was Marilyn Manson's Born Villain under a joint-venture partnership between Manson's own label Hell, etc. and Cooking Vinyl. The album was a global success charting at No. 5 in Germany, No. 10 in the US, and topping Billboard's Hard Rock and Independent album chart. In the UK, Manson reached No. 14 in the Official Albums Chart and No. 1 in the UK Rock Albums Chart.

2011–2020
2014 saw the return of Embrace and their self-titled album, which debuted in the charts at No. 5. In the same year New York rockers The Pretty Reckless reached No. 8, with their second studio album.

In 2015, the Prodigy released their album The Day Is My Enemy, which reached number 1 on the charts, and was certified gold in the UK. 

In 2016, Passenger claimed the UK No. 1 album with Young As The Morning, Old As The Sea. This year also saw singer-songwriter Nina Nesbitt sign a global artist services deal with Cooking Vinyl.

In 2018, Lucy Spraggan, former contestant on The X Factor, signed to both Cooking Vinyl Records and Publishing on a long-term global artist services deal.

Cooking Vinyl has long relationships with many of its artists. The Pixies' Charles Thompson was signed in 2000 and has had 17 releases to date with the label as Frank Black and Black Francis.

Since 1994, former Doll By Doll man Jackie Leven has had 23 releases, five of them in 2009.

Other key artists that have released through the label in the 2010s include Counting Crows, Ryan Adams, Suzanne Vega, The Cult, The Charlatans, The Cranberries, Richard Ashcroft (CV licensed the Righteous Phonographic released album These People, with Ashcroft going on to be signed by BMG), The Subways, Echo and the Bunnymen, Gary Numan, The Enemy, Groove Armada, The Proclaimers, James, Seth Lakeman, UB40, City and Colour and The Dropkick Murphys.

2021–present
In December 2021, Clair Grogan announced that the first Altered Images album in over 38 years would be released in August 2022 on Cooking Vinyl and would be called Mascara Streakz. The album has been recorded  with Bobby Bluebell from The Bluebells and Bernard Butler, formally of Suede and McAlmont & Butler. 

As of December 2021, other artists signed to Cooking Vinyl include Alison Moyet, Eliza & The Delusionals, Lissie, Nina Nesbitt, The Orb, Will Young, Passenger, The Waterboys, BABYMETAL, Fickle Friends, Lucy Spraggan, Rumer, Sophie Ellis-Bextor, The Darkness, The Psychedelic Furs, Billy Bragg, Del Amitri, Kiefer Sutherland, Reverend And The Makers, Suzanne Vega, The Fratellis, The Rifles, and Willy Mason

Sister companies
Essential Music & Marketing
In 2003, Vital Distribution's managing director Mike Chadwick teamed up with Cooking Vinyl’s Martin Goldschmidt to launch Essential Music & Marketing, an independent distributor and service provider.

RED Distribution, the Sony Music UK artist and label services division, announced the acquisition of Essential Music and Marketing in March 2016. As part of this deal, a new company was launched, Red Essential, which is based at The Cooking Vinyl Group’s West London offices. The company is now located in Farringdon.

CV America

Cooking Vinyl America was originally launched in 2012. In 2016, Howie Gabriel was named President. The US operation provides strategic services to the CV Group, including artist/label acquisition, marketing, distribution and business strategy. Cooking Vinyl America is based in New York City.

Cooking Vinyl Australia

Cooking Vinyl Australia was formed in September 2013. The stand-alone company is based in Melbourne and helmed by former Shock Records executives, Leigh Gruppetta and Stu Harvey, the label signs both local and international artists and represents the Cooking Vinyl Records roster in Australia and New Zealand under license. In February 2018, Sony Music Australia acquired a portion of Cooking Vinyl Australia.

Cooking Vinyl Publishing

Cooking Vinyl Publishing was formed in 2008 and is headed by former manager and Warner/Chappell exec Ryan Farley, who joined in August 2018. The company has a diverse roster with current writers including Tom Speight, C Duncan, Vitto Meirelles, Isobel Campbell, Lucy Spraggan, 485C, 65 Days of Static and Palestinian acts DAM, 47 Soul and Le Trio Joubran. 

The company's catalogue includes songs by artists such as Reverend & The Makers, The Rifles, Amber Run, Roll Deep, Meursalt, Tal National, Audio Bullys, Exit Calm and The Virgin Marys. It also has co-publishing partnerships with Brighton-based Fat Cat Records and UK jazz label Edition Music.

Motus Music

In March 2019 The Cooking Vinyl Group announced they had acquired a 50% share in production music start up Motus Music.

Artists

Current

47Soul
'68
Adam Cohen
Area 11
Ali Campbell
Alison Moyet
Amanda Palmer
Babymetal
Billy Bragg
Black Spiders
The Bronx
Calling All Cars
Camper Van Beethoven
Carl Barât and The Jackals
Chas & Dave
City and Colour
DAM
D.A.R.K.
The Darkness
Deap Vally
Del Amitri
Embrace
Fantastic Negrito
Feeder
Fickle Friends
Frank Black
The Fratellis
Gary Numan
Giraffe Tongue Orchestra
Goldie
Grand Duchy
Isobell Campbell
Jon Fratelli
John Wheeler
Kate Miller-Heidke
The King Blues
Lamb
Lawson 
The Lemonheads
Le Trio Joubran
Lewis Watson
Lissie
Lucy Spraggan
Madness
Maxïmo Park
Mexrrissey
Nina Nesbitt
Noah Gundersen
The Orb
Passenger
Paul Kelly
The Proclaimers
The Psychedelic Furs
Reverend and The Makers
Richard Ashcroft
The Rifles
Ron Sexsmith
Röyksopp
Seether
Seth Lakeman
Sophie Ellis-Bextor
Starsailor
The Subways
Saint Raymond
Suzanne Vega
Teddy Thompson
Thea Gilmore
thenewno2
The Travelling Band
TLC
Turin Brakes
The Virginmarys
The Waterboys
Will Young

Past

Ac Acoustics
Alex Chilton
Andy White
Ani DiFranco
Audio Bullys
Bauhaus
Boiled in Lead
Bob Mould
Bruce Cockburn
Cerebral Ballzy
Chris Hillman
Chuck Prophet
Clannad
Clem Snide
Clive Gregson & Christine Collister
Counting Crows
Cowboy Junkies
David Thomas
Davy Spillane
Dawn Landes
Die Goldenen Zitronen
The Dillinger Escape Plan
Dropkick Murphys
Flaco Jiménez
Get Cape. Wear Cape. Fly
Goats Don't Shave
Grant Lee Phillips
Great Big Sea
Groove Armada
Hanson
Hayseed Dixie
HIM
Howling Bells
Idlewild
Jackie Leven
James
Janis Ian
June Tabor
Killing Joke
Loudbomb
Luka Bloom
Marilyn Manson
Michael Messer
Michael Nesmith
Michelle Shocked
Nina Nesbitt 
Nitin Sawhney
Ocean Colour Scene
Oysterband
Prolapse
Pulp
Richard Thompson
Roll Deep
Rory McLeod
Ryan Adams
Skindred
Stephen Duffy
Sweet Honey in the Rock
The Blackout
The Bongos
The Charlatans
The Church
The Cranberries
The Cult
The Dave Graney Show
The Enemy
The Jolly Boys
The Lilac Time
The Mekons
The Nightingales
The Pigeon Detectives
The Pretty Reckless
The Prodigy
The Ukrainians
The Undertones
The Wannadies
The View
They Might Be Giants
Tom Robinson
Turbonegro
T.V. Smith
Underworld
Velvet Crush
Violent Femmes
Weddings Parties Anything
XTC
Ziggy Marley

See also
 List of record labels

References

External links
 Cooking Vinyl Website
 Cooking Vinyl Publishing
 Cooking Vinyl Australia
Motus Music

British independent record labels
Record labels established in 1986
Indie rock record labels
Alternative rock record labels
Electronic music record labels
1986 establishments in the United Kingdom
Music-related lists